C/1680 V1, also called the Great Comet of 1680, Kirch's Comet, and Newton's Comet, was the first comet discovered by telescope. It was discovered by Gottfried Kirch and was one of the brightest comets of the seventeenth century.

Overview

The comet was discovered by Gottfried Kirch, a German astronomer, on 14 November 1680 (New Style), in Coburg, and it became one of the brightest comets of the seventeenth century – reputedly visible even in daytime – and was noted for its spectacularly long tail. It was last observed on 19 March 1681.

While the Kirch Comet of 1680–1681 was discovered by – and subsequently named for – Gottfried Kirch, credit must also be given to Eusebio Kino, the Spanish Jesuit priest who charted the comet’s course. During his delayed departure for Mexico, Kino began his observations of the comet in Cádiz in late 1680. Upon his arrival in Mexico City, he published his Exposición astronómica de el cometa (Mexico City, 1681) in which he presented his findings. Kino’s Exposición astronómica is among the earliest scientific treatises published by a European in the New World.

Basil Ringrose was serving under buccaneer Captain Bartholomew Sharpe and made the following observation shortly before raiding the Spanish port city of Coquimbo, Chile:

Friday, November 19th, 1680. This morning about an hour before day we observed a comet to appear a degree N. from the bright in Libra. The body thereof seemed dull, and its tail extended itself 18 or 20 degrees in length, being of a pale colour and pointing directly N.N.W. Our prisoners hereupon reported to us that the Spaniards had seen very strange sights, both at Lima, the capital city of Peru, Guayaquil, and other places, much about the time of our coming into the South Seas.

Although it was undeniably a sungrazing comet, it was probably not part of the Kreutz family. Isaac Newton used the comet to test and verify Kepler's laws. John Flamsteed was the first to propose that the two bright comets of 1680–1681 were the same comet, one travelling inbound to the Sun and the other outbound, and Newton originally disputed this. Newton later changed his mind, and then, with Edmond Halley's help, purloined some of Flamsteed's data to indeed verify this was the case without giving Flamsteed credit.

See also
 Great comet
 Halley's Comet
 Lists of comets

References

External links

 The Great Comet of 1680 Over Rotterdam (APOD 28 October 2013)

Sungrazing comets
Non-periodic comets
Great Comet of 1680
16801114
Great comets